Bertalan Farkas (born August 2, 1949) is the first Hungarian cosmonaut, space explorer and fighter pilot. Hungary became the seventh nation to be represented in space by him. Farkas is also the first Esperantist cosmonaut. He is currently the president of Airlines Service and Trade. 

Following his mission, Hungarian-American Károly Simonyi (Charles Simonyi) was the second Hungarian astronaut – the only person in the entire world who has been twice in space as a space tourist and who had paid for himself for the spaceflights. The next Hungarian astronaut will travel to the International Space Station by 2025.

Early life and military career

Born in Gyulaháza, he graduated from the György Kilián Aeronautical College in Szolnok in 1969. He then attended the Krasnodar Military Aviation Institute in the Soviet Union, from where he graduated in 1972.

After earning his qualifications at university, Farkas joined the Hungarian Air Force and rose to the rank of Brigadier General.

He also attended the Bessenyei György Gimnázium in Kisvárda.

Intercosmos program

In 1978 he volunteered to become a cosmonaut and was selected as part of the fifth international programme for Interkosmos. His backup cosmonaut was Béla Magyari.

Farkas, along with Soviet cosmonaut Valery Kubasov, was launched into space on Soyuz 36 from Baikonur Cosmodrome on May 26, 1980, at 18:20 (UTC).

While in orbit, Farkas conducted experiments in materials science. After 7 days, 20 hours and 45 minutes, and having completed 124 orbits, Farkas and Kubasov returned to Earth, landing 140 km southeast of Jezkazgan. Bertalan Farkas was awarded the title Hero of the Soviet Union on June 30, 1980.

Personal life

Farkas is married to Anikó Farkas, and has four children: Gábor, Aida, Ádám and Bertalan. He loves tennis and plays it often.

He was a member of the Hungarian Democratic Forum, a Hungarian conservative political party, and was its candidate at the 2006 parliamentary election in the Baktalórántháza election district. He holds the rank of Commander (CLJ) in the Military and Hospitaller Order of Saint Lazarus of Jerusalem in Hungary.

References

External links
Spacefacts biography of Bertalan Farkas
 His biography at Hungary.hu

1949 births
Living people
People from Szabolcs-Szatmár-Bereg County
Hungarian Esperantists
Hungarian astronauts
Recipients of the Order of Lenin
Foreign Heroes of the Soviet Union
Hungarian Democratic Forum politicians
20th-century Hungarian people
Astronaut-politicians
Salyut program cosmonauts